The Georgia International Convention Center or GICC, opened in April 2003, is the second largest convention center in the U.S. state of Georgia, the largest being the Georgia World Congress Center. It is located at 2000 Convention Center Concourse, just off Camp Creek Parkway (S.R. 6) and Roosevelt Highway (U.S. 29) in College Park. The Convention Center is accessible from the Airport MARTA station (via a connection to the ATL Skytrain), Interstate 285, and Interstate 85.

It has a number of exhibit halls, meeting rooms and ballrooms that can be rented.

Behind the Convention Center, the Atlanta Airport people-mover called ATL Skytrain, connects airport patrons with the new rental car complex, four hotel accommodations, and restaurants at the Gateway Center of the Georgia International Convention Center. It is connected via ATL Skytrain.

In 2016, it was to be the home to the Atlanta Vultures of American Indoor Football but they never played a home game due to turf issues.

On November 10, 2016, the Atlanta Hawks announced it had purchased an expansion team to play in the NBA Development League with the intentions of building a new 3,500-seat arena at the Gateway Center Arena to be its home for the 2019–20 season. The expansion team then began play in 2017 as the Erie BayHawks in Erie, Pennsylvania, while the arena was being finished.

On November 8, 2019, the Gateway Center Arena officially opened. The Gateway Center Arena will be home to the WNBA's Atlanta Dream for the 2020 season   as well as the NBA G League team the College Park Skyhawks.

Previous location
Prior to 2003, the Georgia International Convention Center was located behind and connected with the Sheraton Atlanta Airport Hotel on Riverdale Road.  However, because of runway expansion at the airport, they were forced to move to the current location. The previous location still exists, and the former exhibit halls are rented out primarily as temporary storage and soundstage services for Atlanta's burgeoning TV and film production industry.

References

External links
Georgia International Convention Center website
Gateway Center Arena website

Buildings and structures in Atlanta
Convention centers in Georgia (U.S. state)
Tourist attractions in Atlanta
College Park, Georgia
Indoor arenas in Georgia (U.S. state)
Basketball venues in Georgia (U.S. state)
Sports venues completed in 2009
2009 establishments in Georgia (U.S. state)